Sunflower is a 2006 South Korean action film directed by Kang Seok-beom.

Premise 
Former gangster Tae-sik is released from prison and heads back to his hometown to live in a small restaurant with a woman. Attempting to leave his past behind, he takes a job in a garage and tries to keep away from the local gangs, most of whom still live in fear of his brutal reputation. When a local politician wants to knock down his adoptive mom's restaurant to build a new shopping mall, Tae-sik struggles to avoid returning to a life of violence.

Cast 
 Kim Rae-won - Oh Tae-sik
 Kim Hae-sook
 Huh E-jae
 Kim Byung-ok
 Kim Jung-tae - Yang-ki
 Han Jung-soo
 Ji Dae-han
 Park Sung-woong
 Park Cheol-ho

Release 
Sunflower was released in South Korea on 23 November 2006, and topped the box office on its opening weekend with 267,065 admissions.

References

External links 
 
 
 

2006 films
2000s Korean-language films
2000s crime action films
Showbox films
South Korean crime action films
2000s South Korean films